In June 2017, Ireland played a two-test series against Japan as part of the 2017 mid-year rugby union tests. It was the first time Ireland had played a test series against Japan in Japan since 2005. The series was part of the fifth year of the global rugby calendar established by the International Rugby Board, which runs through to 2019.

Fixtures

Squads
Note: Ages, caps and clubs are as per 17 June, the first test match of the tour.

Ireland
On 16 May 2017, Joe Schmidt named a 31-man squad for the 2017 Summer Tour. On 22 May, Connacht lock Quinn Roux was added to the squad. On 31 May, Tommy O'Donnell was ruled out of the tour due to an ankle injury. Following an ankle injury sustained in the test against the United States, fly-half Joey Carbery was ruled out of the remainder of the tour. Ulster's Sean Reidy was also called up to replace Tommy O'Donnell.

Coaching team:
 Head coach:  Joe Schmidt
 Skills coach:  Girvan Dempsey &  Felix Jones
 Forwards coach:  Simon Easterby

Japan
On 29 May, Jamie Joseph named a 33-man squad ahead of their two-test series against Ireland and one-off test match against Romania.

Head Coach:  Jamie Joseph

Matches

First Test

Notes:
 Will Tupou (Japan) and Kieran Treadwell and Rory O'Loughlin (both Ireland) made their international debuts.

Second Test

Notes:
 John Cooney (Ireland) made his international debut.
 Michael Leitch (Japan) and Devin Toner (Ireland) earned their 50th test caps.

Statistics
Key
Con: Conversions
Pen: Penalties
DG: Drop goals
Pts: Points

Ireland statistics

Test series statistics

See also
 2017 mid-year rugby union internationals

References

2016–17 in Irish rugby union
2016–17 in Japanese rugby union
2017 rugby union tours
2017
June 2017 sports events in Japan
2017